Sphenophryne is a genus of frogs in the family Microhylidae from New Guinea. It reached its current composition in 2017 when Rivera and colleagues brought the genera Genyophryne, Liophryne, and Oxydactyla into synonymy of the then-monotypic Sphenophryne. However, the AmphibiaWeb continues to recognize these genera as valid.

Species
There are 14 species:

References

 
Microhylidae
Amphibian genera
Amphibians of Oceania
Taxa named by Wilhelm Peters
Taxa named by Giacomo Doria